Douradina is a municipality located in the Brazilian state of Mato Grosso do Sul. Its population was 5,975 (2020) and its area is 281 km², which makes it the smallest municipality in the state.

References 

Municipalities in Mato Grosso do Sul